Daniel Nestor and Nenad Zimonjić were the defending champions, but lost in the semifinals to Mahesh Bhupathi and Mark Knowles.

Mahesh Bhupathi and Mark Knowles won in the final 6–4, 6–3 against Max Mirnyi and Andy Ram.

Seeds
All seeds receive a bye into the second round.

Draw

Finals

Top half

Bottom half

External links
 Draw

Masters - Doubles